The Point of Shoals Light was a lighthouse located in the James River in Virginia.

History
The first request for a light to mark the shoal at this bend in the river came in 1835, but a light was not constructed here until 1855. It was the target of a Confederate raid in the Civil War, and by 1869 concerns were raised about its safety. These concerns were realized two years later when damage from ice flows brought about the rebuilding of the structure.

This light was automated fairly early, in 1932. Its unmanned life was brief, as continued shoaling in old channel led to the dredging of a new channel on the opposite side of the river the following year, at which point the light was deactivated. The house was removed in the 1960s, but the iron foundation remains, unlit.

Notes

References
Point of Shoals Light, from the Chesapeake Chapter of the United States Lighthouse Society

Lighthouses in Virginia
Lighthouses completed in 1871
Houses completed in 1871
James River (Virginia)
Lighthouses in the Chesapeake Bay